Susanne Abbuehl (born July 30, 1970) is a Swiss/Dutch jazz singer and composer.

As a child she received lessons in harpsichord, playing baroque music. At the age of 17 she went to Los Angeles where she went to a high school attending music lessons on a daily basis, being part of an ensemble that toured the U.S. and Canada. She studied at the Royal Conservatory of The Hague, Netherlands with Jeanne Lee and Rachel Gould and earned a master's degree in performance and pedagogy. She became a student of Indian classical singer Prabha Atre in Mumbai. Abbuehl studied composition with Dutch composer Diderik Wagenaar.

In 2001, her album April was released by ECM  and won an Edison award (Dutch Grammy). She tours with her band and other jazz musicians in Europe, North America, and Africa, playing in Montreal, Maputo, Cape Town, Rome, Paris, Zurich, Oslo, and other European cities. In May 2006, her album Compass was released by ECM (with Michel Portal). In 2013, her radio play Der Gaukler Tag was nominated for the Prix Marulic. In her work, influences of classical music can be found. Her artistic identity is characterized by minimal instrumentation and arrangements and can be described as chamber jazz.

Abbuehl is a professor of jazz voice and ensemble at Lucerne University of Applied Sciences and Arts as well as at the HEMU Lausanne. She has taught master classes throughout Europe.

Discography 
 I Am Rose (Evoke, 1997)
 April (ECM, 2001)
 Ida Lupino (Radio Nederland, 2002)
 Compass (ECM, 2006)
 The Gift (ECM, 2013)

References

External links 
 Official site

1970 births
Living people
Royal Conservatory of The Hague alumni
Avant-garde jazz singers
Continental jazz singers
ECM Records artists
Post-bop singers
Swiss jazz singers
Dutch jazz singers
People from Bern
21st-century Swiss musicians
20th-century Swiss women singers
21st-century Swiss women singers
21st-century Dutch women singers
21st-century Dutch singers